Mahmood Saad may refer to:

Mahmoud Saad (footballer, born 1952), retired Egyptian footballer and football manager
Mahmoud Saad (footballer, born 1983), Egyptian footballer currently playing for Al Kharaitiyat SC
Mahmoud Saad (judoka) (born 1958), Syrian Olympic judoka